Marian Harkin (born 26 November 1953) is an Irish Independent politician who has been a Teachta Dála (TD) for the Sligo–Leitrim constituency since the 2020 general election, and previously from 2002 to 2007. She previously served as a Member of the European Parliament (MEP) from 2004 to 2019.

Early and family life
Harkin was born in Ballintogher, County Sligo, in 1953. She studied at University College Dublin, where she attained a Bachelor of Science degree in geology. She worked as a teacher of mathematics in a secondary school in Sligo for 23 years, before entering into politics.

Community activism
While living in Manorhamilton, Harkin became active in the voluntary and community sector and developed the view that people living in disadvantaged areas such as Connacht had to rely on their own initiative and energy to progress development of their region. Her work at local level led to her appointment to Developing the West Together, which evolved into the Council for the West, of which Harkin became chairperson.

Irish politics
She was elected to Dáil Éireann as an Independent TD for the Sligo–Leitrim constituency at the 2002 general election, receiving the highest number of first preference votes in the constituency.

Member of the European Parliament, 2004–2019
At the 2004 European Parliament election, she was returned as an MEP for the North-West constituency topping the poll and being elected on the fourth count. She had previously contested the 1999 European Parliament election in the same constituency (then called Connacht–Ulster), but had narrowly failed to be elected, losing out to Dana Rosemary Scallon for the third seat in the constituency. However, in 2004, the position was reversed and Harkin was returned at Scallon's expense.

Harkin resigned from her Dáil seat at the 2007 general election to concentrate on her European seat.

She was a member of the Alliance of Liberals and Democrats for Europe group (ALDE) in the European Parliament, which comprises 85 MEPs from 19 member states. Harkin was a member of the European Parliament's Committee on Employment and Social Affairs and the delegation for relations with the United States. She has been European Democratic Party Vice-President since December 2012. In addition, she served as Vice-Chairwoman of the European Parliament Intergroup on Integrity (Transparency, Anti-Corruption and Organized Crime). She is also a supporter of the MEP Heart Group, a group of parliamentarians who have an interest in promoting measures that will help reduce the burden of cardiovascular diseases (CVD).

She was re-elected to the European Parliament at the 2009 European Parliament election topping the poll in her constituency. She was again re-elected at the 2014 European Parliament election, taking the fourth seat in the new Midlands-North-West constituency.

On 1 April 2019, she announced that she was not standing for re-election in the 2019 European Parliament election, and the following January, she announced she was standing in the 2020 Irish general election.

References

External links
Marian Harkin's page on the VoteWatch website

1953 births
Living people
Alumni of University College Dublin
21st-century women MEPs for the Republic of Ireland
Independent MEPs for Ireland
Independent TDs
Members of the 29th Dáil
Members of the 33rd Dáil
21st-century women Teachtaí Dála
MEPs for the Republic of Ireland 2004–2009
MEPs for the Republic of Ireland 2009–2014
MEPs for the Republic of Ireland 2014–2019
Politicians from County Sligo
European Democratic Party